Maxim Kirovich Ammosov (Russian: Макси́м Ки́рович Аммо́сов; 22 December 1897 — 28 July 1938) was a Yakutian revolutionary and Soviet politician who played a leading role in the establishment of the Yakut Autonomous Soviet Socialist Republic. 

From 1937 he served as First Secretary of the Communist Party of Kirghizia until his removal during the Great Purge in 1938.

Biography

Early life 
Ammosov was born in to a poor family and was raised by his uncle due to his parents' poverty. 

He became involved in the revolutionary from 1916 and a year later in March joined the Bolsheviks.

In March 1917 he became secretary of the executive bureau of the Yakut Committee for Public Safety. From March 1918 to March 1920 he was in exile in Siberia, where he worked in the underground organizations of Tomsk, Irkutsk and Chelyabinsk.

Soviet politician 
From March 1920 he was authorized by the Siberian Bureau of the Central Committee of the Russian Communist Party P (B) to establish the Yakut Regional Committee of RCP (b) and the Siberian Revolutionary Committee for the Organization of Soviet Authorities in Yakutia. In May of the same year he headed the Yakutsk District Revolutionary Committee, and in June of the same year he was chairman of the Yakutsk District Organizing Bureau of the RCP (b). From October 1921 to June 1922 he held the position of head of the Yakut section at the provincial bureau of the RCP (b). He was later sent to Moscow to grant Yakutia autonomy. From June to December 1922 he was executive secretary of the Yakutsk regional organizational bureau of the RCP (b). After that, until March 1923 year, held the post of Executive Secretary of the Yakutsk Regional Committee of the RCP (b).

From March to August 1923 he was People's Commissar of Trade and Industry of the Yakut Autonomous Soviet Socialist Republic, after which he held the post of Permanent Representative of the Republic to the Presidium of the Central Executive Committee in Moscow. From June 1925 to August 1928 he headed the Council of People's Commissars of the Yakut ASSR and from March 1927 to August 1928 he was chairman of the Central Executive Committee. From September 1930 to February 1932 he studied at the theoretical department of the Agrarian Institute of the Institute of Red Professors.

In March 1932 he was appointed secretary of the Organizing Bureau of the Kazakhstan Regional Committee of the All-Union Communist Party (b) for the West Kazakhstan region, after which he became the first secretary of the West Kazakhstan Regional Committee of the VKP (b). He held that position until May 1934. Also from February 1934 to March 1937 he was the first secretary of the Karaganda and North Kazakhstan regional committees of the VKP (b). At that time he opposed the methods of collectivization, which led to high mortality from starvation.

From March to April 1937 he held the post of First Secretary of the Kyrgyz Regional Committee of the VKP (b), then from April to June served as First Secretary of the Central Committee of the of Communist Party of Kirghizia (b).

Arrest and purge 
On November 7, 1937, during a demonstration by the working people dedicated to the 20th anniversary of the Great October Socialist Revolution, a counter-revolutionary slogan was said by Ammosov, which was also heard on the radio throughout the city of Frunze. According to Semyon Lipkin who was present, recalled that Ammosov accidentally yelled "long live the victory of fascism throughout the world!". He then corrected himself by saying “Under the brilliant leadership of the great Stalin, forward to the victory of communism throughout the world!” 

On the same day, the emergency bureau of the Central Committee of the Communist Party of Kyrgyzstan removed Ammosov from all posts and raised the question of his party compliance. Subsequently, Ammosov wrote telegrams to Joseph Stalin trying to explain his mistake, but never received an answer: 

I allowed a counter-revolutionary slander. Repeating the slogan “Down with fascism! Long live communism!", mixed up the words and came out with a counter-revolutionary slogan 

Ammosov was arrested on November 16, 1937 in the city of Frunze. He was shot on July 28, 1938 in Moscow. 

Maksim Ammosov was rehabilitated posthumously on April 28, 1956 by the decision of the Military Collegium of the Supreme Court of the Soviet Union.

References 

1897 births
Yakut people
Bolsheviks
All-Russian Central Executive Committee members
Great Purge victims from Kyrgyzstan
Soviet rehabilitations
First secretaries of the Communist Party of Kirghizia
Institute of Red Professors alumni
Soviet politicians
Recipients of the Order of the Red Banner
1938 deaths